Rajé Shwari (born August 4, 1977)  is an American-born Indian hip hop artist who is known for bringing her Bollywood sound to the hip hop scene. Rajé is best known for her feature on Timbaland & Magoo's instant runway hit "Indian Flute". The song remains the crowd favourite worldwide in many underground hip hop and desi clubs and opened the door for Rajé to work with other big names such as Jay-Z, Nas, Kanye West, Missy Elliott and Pharrell.

Early years 

Brought up just outside Philadelphia, Pennsylvania, Rajé'sfirst-generationn born upbringing provided her with a unique blend of cross cultural experiences that created the intriguingly hybrid talent that she is today.  Growing up in a traditional Indian household, immersed in a vibrant cultural atmosphere, as well as being deep rooted in her parents classical music practice at home, Rajé embraced her Hindi & Gujarati tongue through Bollywood movies and Navratri Garba festivals, while managing to live the life of a typical American teenager. Coming of age during her school years while surveying the ever-changing pop culture landscape, she began identifying her affinity for hip hop music in particular.  She credits what she calls her “very strict and old fashioned” parents, who gave her the limited freedom of “buying records and going to rock concerts” as long as she got good grades, as the reason her initial love of music as just a loyal fan turned into her life's true passion.

Rajé's father took the reward system “trade off” of her successful academic efforts for furthering her musical pursuits to the next level when he started booking studio time whenever she came home with a favorable report card. Though music remained a side hobby, it was during her college years when Rajé got word of her first record deal offer overseas, and with her parents blessing, she dropped her studies to pursue her music professionally.  
As the daughter of immigrants pursuing a new life in the land of opportunity, Rajé began to understand that her own family's support of her dream and her unconventional career choice in the music industry was truly a modern-day version of the “American Dream” and likely to inspire millions of other young ethnic people born outside of their respective homelands, living the same experience here in the U.S., also trying to establish their own identities and find common ground between a traditional and modern world.  It was then, Rajé says, her “aha” moment came, suddenly realizing the greater mission at hand and her new found responsibility to represent her cultural background and to, subsequently, use the story of her life to inspire others to honor their own “roots” and cultural history.

Music career 

Coming up through the coveted ranks of the illustrious American hip hop music scene, Rajé brought her Indian flavor to a string of hit releases for many of hip hop's biggest stars, and by 2005, in less than a two-year span, suddenly mainstream radio listeners found themselves hypnotized by her sultry Hindi refrains time and again. Rajé was dubbed "Timbaland's Protege" and was featured on his hit single "Indian Flute". Later Rajé was given the chance to work with Jay-Z on his single "The Bounce", which was a 9/11 tribute.

1999–2002: UK dance music years 

 Exploring South Asian UK Scene.
 Worship You - ZYX/Sony Single Deal
 Queer As Folk
 The L Word

2002–2006: Hip-hop years

 Signed to Timberland/Beatclub
 Hip Hop Records made
 Deal shopping/Pharrell
 Powermix DJ Summit
 Rajé walks away from Timberland Camp

2006–2011: Artist exploration/Personal and professional struggles

2011–2014: Entrepreneur/artist becomes CEO 

 Atlanta/Philly
 Established Hidden Jewel Records
 Established BollyHood Records

2015-Present: Album launch

Personal life

Artistry

BollyHood 

In the years to follow, Rajé's cult fan base tracked her underground career as she continued to further appear as the featured artist with more of hip hop's elite such as 50 Cent, Petey Pablo, Beenie Man & Missy Elliott before making the bold decision to venture out of what was then her third contract, and start her own production company. Rajé refers to that period in her life as the time she had to take to experiment musically, get more innovative with her creativity, but most importantly, gain the confidence to build herself a “home” where she could develop a new musical style, sound and genre all her own, eventually aspiring to groom other artists in the future to come through the gateway in which she might be able to share the spotlight—this home becoming the birthplace of her vision, her sound, her passion that she would go on to brand and trademark as “BollyHood”. Rajé coined the term "BollyHood" to help explain the mash-up between hip hop and Bollywood that she so artfully crafted. Although many artists and producers, including Timbaland himself, tried to create their own BollyHood sound, Rajé's unique sound was never quite replicated well enough to reach the same level of promising success Rajé experienced so early in her career. With the stage being set for her to bring full circle what is likely to become a musical revolution in the making, the confident Founder and CEO of BollyHood Records states her current mission at hand is to take what was her original formula to the next level and introduce the world to an even more undeniable commercial fusion.

Legacy and cultural influences

Awards and achievements 

 2012: BollyHood Records established by Founder/CEO Rajé Shwari
 2013: NBA 2K13 Video Game Release: Rajé Shwari was a Featured Artist in the main online advertisement trailer "The Bounce", and also featured on the world-renowned video game NBA 2K13 itself inclusive with Jay-Z's executive-produced soundtrack, which sold over 10 million copies.
 2014: In February 2014, the prestigious Smithsonian Institution launched a permanent exhibit in its Natural History Museum in Washington D.C. entitled “Beyond Bollywood” showcasing the contributions of prominent South Asians.  Rajé Shwari was given the distinct honor of being inducted in the category of Hip Hop Music. The exhibit sought out U.S.-born South Asian Americans who have impacted United States history in some major way, covering all categories from music to science to film to agriculture and beyond.  The exhibit first displayed in Washington D.C. toured the country for two years beginning in 2016 before returning to its permanent stay in the world-renowned museum with hopes of expansion as the cultural impact of South Asians on the nation grows.

 2015:  Rajé Shwari named to the prominent South Asian Media Outlet brand's The ANOKHI 2015 LIST of Today's Most Prolific South Asians in the company of Mindy Kaling, Priyanka Chopra, Freida Pinto & Dr. Sanjay Gupta as well as many other relevant South Asians globally who have made an outstanding impact in social, economic or pop culture.

Discography

References 

1977 births
Living people
American hip hop singers
American women singers of Indian descent
21st-century American singers
21st-century American women singers